Touch is a ballet made by David Parsons on the New York City Ballet to music by Richard Peaslee. The premiere took place February 15, 1996, at the New York State Theater, Lincoln Center.

Original cast 
   
Stacey Calvert
Michele Gifford
Monique Meunier
Teresa Reyes
 
Albert Evans
Tom Gold
Edwaard Liang
Damian Woetzel

Articles and reviews   
NY Times review by Anna Kisselgoff, February 17th, 1996
NY Times article by Anna Kisselgoff, March 3rd, 1996
NY Times review by Jennifer Dunning, June 25, 1996

New York City Ballet repertory
Ballets by David Parsons
Ballets by Richard Peaslee
1996 ballet premieres